Hopang is the capital of Hopang Township, Shan State, Myanmar (Burma). It is also the government designated capital of the Wa Self-Administered Division.

Geography
Hopang is located in the valley of the Nam Ting River, a tributary of the Salween.

Further reading
 Harold Mason Young, Burma Headhunters, Xlibris, 2014,

References

Populated places in Shan State
Township capitals of Myanmar